Nic Case (born 1963) is an American radio-controlled model hobbyist from Southern California specializing in speedrunning. He is notable for becoming the first person to reach  with his radio-controlled car, the R/C Bullet, having surpassed his records three times with a confirmed entry at the Guinness World Records in 2008, 2013 and 2014. His attempt has been documented by the Discovery Channel and was cited in an episode of Tosh.0.

Biography 
A clay modeller for Ford Motor Company in Irvine, California, Nic Case took up radio-controlled cars in 1990 following a motorcycle accident.

He later used a Schumacher Mi3 as a base, the car powered by a  R/C aircraft motor and a 12-cell battery pack. The car also had a four-wheel drive system of his own design for improved traction and his own tires, which were vulcanized to the aluminum rims, to improve airflow underneath the vehicle. To prevent the car from flipping over, he added a gyroscope steering-correction system from radio-controlled helicopters. The car took six months to build, at a cost of $4,000. This paid off at the ISC Speed Run event in Rockingham Dragway, Rockingham, North Carolina, on October 4, 2008, where the car reached a speed of 

Case made another attempt in 2011 when he collaborated with Associated Electrics, which built him a Team Associated SR11. The SR11 was based on the Nitro TC3, a 1:10 scale Nitro Touring Car, but was powered by an electric motor producing 10horsepower fed by twelve lithium polymer batteries and weighing , with a vertical tailfin mounted to the body for stability. His attempt at the Auto Club Speedway was documented by the Discovery Channel.

Unable to bring this any further, and leaving his new record unconfirmed, he briefly retired when his 17-year-old nephew was killed in a hit and run accident. This led Case to reconsider his retirement and submit his recent record to Guinness.

At an event organized by the Radio Operated Scale Speed Association (ROSSA), he finally reached  at St. George, Utah.

References

External links 
 Guinness World Records entry

Associated Electrics people
Ford people
Living people
Radio-controlled car personalities
1963 births
People from Irvine, California
Place of birth missing (living people)